Ibrahim Al Hasan (born July 10, 1981 in Syria) is a retired Syrian football player who played lastly currently playing for Al-Nawair in the Syrian Premier League.

During the Syrian Civil War he joined the Free Syrian Army.

Goals for Senior National Team

External links
 

1981 births
Living people
Syrian footballers
Syria international footballers
Syrian expatriate footballers
Association football midfielders
Afrin SC players
Expatriate footballers in Jordan
Syrian expatriate sportspeople in Jordan
Syrian Premier League players
Members of the Free Syrian Army
Salafi jihadists